The  is a high-rise building in Shiodome, Tokyo, Japan. It is 172.6 m (564 ft) high, has 34 floors, and 66,489 m² (710,400 ft²) of floor space. Construction began in 2000, and the building opened in 2003. It was designed by Seita Morishima, and built by Kajima Construction.

Floors 1–24 are the headquarters of Kyodo News, a nonprofit cooperative news agency. Floors 25–34 is Park Hotel Tokyo, a member of Design Hotels AG. The building features an atrium that begins with the hotel lobby on the building's 25th floor and extends to the 34th floor, providing panoramic views over Tokyo.

External links 
 
https://web.archive.org/web/20081217073642/http://www.shiodomemediatower.jp/
Park Hotel Tokyo (Japanese)
Park Hotel Tokyo English Official Website (English)

Buildings and structures in Minato, Tokyo
Commercial buildings completed in 2003
Shiodome
Skyscraper hotels in Tokyo
Skyscraper office buildings in Tokyo